Beltanodus is an extinct genus of prehistoric lungfish which lived during the Triassic period.

References 

Prehistoric lungfish genera
Triassic fish of North America